Off! is the second studio album by the band Off! It was released on May 8, 2012 by Vice Records on CD and LP and by Burger Records on cassette.

The album was recorded in three days, from February 16–18, 2012, at Kingsize Soundlabs.

Track listing

Personnel
Off!
 Dimitri Coats – guitar,  production
 Steven Shane McDonald – bass guitar, mixing
 Keith Morris – vocals
 Mario Rubalcaba – drums

Production
 JJ Golden – mastering
 Andrew Lynch – engineering
 Raymond Pettibon – artwork

References

External links
 

2012 albums
Off! albums
Vice Records albums
Albums recorded at Kingsize Soundlabs